John Arthur Moran (born March 22, 1932) is a Republican Party donor and retired businessman.

Personal life and education
Moran was born in Los Angeles, California in 1932. His father was a self-taught accountant. Moran graduated from the University of Utah in 1954, majoring in banking and finance. After graduation, Moran joined the Navy via Officer Candidate School, serving for three years, mostly as an aerial photographic intelligence officer at Pearl Harbor.

Career
After leaving the Navy, Moran worked at Blyth & Company, Inc., an investment banking firm, eventually becoming a vice president. In 1967, Moran joined Dyson-Kissner, becoming an executive vice president in 1974. Moran retired from Dyson Kissner-Moran in 1998. Moran has also served Senior Advisor of Catalytic Capital Investment Corporation, and as president of Rutherford-Moran Exploration Company, a subsidiary of Chevron Thailand. Moran also served on the board of Wynn Resorts.

Philanthropy
Moran helped establish the John A. Moran Eye Center at the University of Utah, and is affiliated with the Metropolitan Museum of Art, National Advisory Council of the University of Utah, and the George and Barbara Bush Endowment for Innovation Cancer Research at M.D. Anderson Cancer Center at the University of Texas. Moran helped finance the John A. and Carole O. Moran Gallery for later Roman art and sarcophagi at the Metropolitan Museum.

Political activities
Moran served as the finance chair of the Republican National Committee from 1993 to 1995, and as national finance chairman of Bob Dole's 1996 presidential campaign. Moran also served as an honorary co-chairman of the Republican Leadership Council. In 1997, Moran wrote a letter opposing the power of the Christian Coalition and the far-right in the Republican Party. Moran was a top fundraiser for John McCain in 2008, and joined the Mitt Romney campaign in April 2012. Moran has donated to the political causes of the Koch Brothers.

References

1932 births
American businesspeople
American philanthropists
Florida Republicans
Living people
People from Los Angeles
People from Palm Beach County, Florida
 
University of Utah alumni